Khensa (Khenensaiuw) was a Nubian queen dated to the Twenty-fifth Dynasty of Egypt.

Khensa is named as a King's Wife and King's Sister together with King Piye. This suggests she is the sister-wife of the Pharaoh and hence likely a daughter of Kashta and Pebatjma.

Her full titles include: Noble Lady, Great of Praises, Sweet of Love, Beloved one of Wadjet, Mistress of Grace, Lady of all Woman, King's Wife, Great King's Wife, Lady of Upper and Lower Egypt, Lady of the Two Lands, King's Daughter, King's Sister, and the one who pacifies the King every day.

Khensa is attested on a statue - with Piye - dedicated to the goddess Bastet. She was buried in a pyramid at el-Kurru (Ku4). The tomb still contained parts of the funerary equipment such as an offering table, vases, canopic jars, etc.

References

8th-century BC Egyptian women
Queens consort of the Twenty-fifth Dynasty of Egypt
8th-century BC Egyptian people